Tubber is a village in County Offaly, Ireland.

The Roman Catholic parish of Tubber spans the civil parishes of Kilcumreragh and Kilmanaghan.
St. Manchan's National School in Tubber is named after St. Manchan, the local saint. 
His name is also reflected in that of the parish of Kilmonaghan and the old cemetery and church in Kilmonaghan.

The Tubber G.A.A. (Gaelic Athletic Association) Club was established in April 1979, and took over responsibility for Tubber Hall. Due to difficulties with the lease, the club later obtained and improved a field and built dressing rooms, officially opened in May 1989. Since then several improvements have been made to the facilities.

References

Towns and villages in County Offaly